Northside Independent School District is a school district headquartered in Leon Valley, Texas. It is the largest school district in the San Antonio area and the fourth largest in the State of Texas. Northside serves  of urban landscape, suburban growth and rural territory in the San Antonio suburbs and the Hill Country.  Northside is roughly 50 percent built out with the center of the district's boundaries near Helotes, just north of the Bandera Road and Loop 1604 intersection. Because of fast-paced growth, the district envisions possibly another four high schools over the next few decades, including far west areas off Potranco Road and Hwy 211 (near the Medina County line), Culebra Road (FM 471) past Talley Road, I-10 near Boerne Stage Road (north of the Dominion) and far north Bandera Road (Hwy 16) near the Pipe Creek/Bandera County/Medina County areas.

Northside ISD serves a portion of the city of San Antonio as well as the cities of Grey Forest, Leon Valley, Shavano Park, Helotes, and the unincorporated communities of Cross Mountain, Leon Springs, and Scenic Oaks. The district also serves some unincorporated portions of Bexar, Bandera and Medina counties.

In 2011, the school district was rated "recognized" by the Texas Education Agency for the fourth consecutive year.

Administration

Superintendent 
The current superintendent of Northside Independent School District is Dr. Brian Woods. Prior to his appointment in 2012, he was a social studies teacher, administrator, the assistant superintendent for secondary administration, and the named deputy superintendent for administration for the school district.

Campuses
Northside ISD has over 110 campus locations:

High schools

Northside has chosen a unique method of naming its traditional high schools; each school is named for a former or current United States Supreme Court justice.  Under current district policy, eighth graders who will be part of a new high school's first graduating class are encouraged to research prior justices and submit nominations.

The justices so honored are Louis D. Brandeis, William J. Brennan, Tom C. Clark, John Marshall Harlan, Oliver Wendell Holmes, John Jay, John Marshall (the oldest high school; originally named Northside Rural High School but later renamed to conform to the naming convention), Sandra Day O'Connor (attended the school's dedication), John Paul Stevens (also attended the school's dedication), William Howard Taft, and Earl Warren. The 12th and newest high school in the district, Sonia M. Sotomayor High School, opened on August 22nd, 2022. The school is named after the Supreme Court justice Sonia M. Sotomayor, who is the first woman of color, first Hispanic and first Latina to serve on the Supreme Court. 

 Louis D. Brandeis High School, (opened 2008)
 William J. Brennan High School, (opened 2010)
 Tom C. Clark High School, (opened 1978)
 John Marshall Harlan High School, (opened 2017)
 Oliver Wendell Holmes High School, (opened 1964)
 John Jay High School, (opened 1967)
 John Marshall High School, Leon Valley (opened 1950) (formerly Northside High School, renamed in 1960)
National Blue Ribbon School in 1992-93
 Sandra Day O'Connor High School, (opened 1998)
 Sonia M. Sotomayor High School, (opened 2022)
 John Paul Stevens High School, (opened 2005)
 William H. Taft High School (opened 1985)
National Blue Ribbon School in 1997-98
 Earl Warren High School, San Antonio (opened 2002)

Magnet high schools

 NSITE High School, San Antonio
 Communications Arts High School, San Antonio
 Construction Careers Academy, San Antonio
 Health Careers High School, San Antonio
National Blue Ribbon School in 1990–91
 John Jay Science and Engineering Academy, San Antonio

Middle schools

Joe J. Bernal Middle School, North San Antonio 
Dolph Briscoe Middle School, North San Antonio 
John B. Connally Middle School, Northwest San Antonio 
John M. Folks Middle School, Northwest San Antonio
Hector Garcia Middle School, Northwest San Antonio 
William P. Hobby Middle School, North-Central San Antonio 
Wallace B. Jefferson Middle School, Northwest San Antonio 
Anson Jones Magnet Middle School, North San Antonio 
Jack C. Jordan Middle School, San Antonio 
Gregory Luna Middle School, North San Antonio 
Pat Neff Middle School, North Central San Antonio 
E. M. Pease Middle School, North San Antonio 
Ed Rawlinson Middle School, San Antonio
Sam Rayburn Middle School, San Antonio
Sul Ross Middle School, Northeast San Antonio
Earl Rudder Middle School, North Central San Antonio
Coke R. Stevenson Middle School, Northwest San Antonio
National Blue Ribbon School in 1990-91
Katherine Stinson Middle School, Central San Antonio
Robert L. Vale Middle School, Northwest San Antonio
H.B. Zachry Middle School, Northwest-Central San Antonio

Elementary schools

Adams Hill (1972)
Allen (1960)
Aue (2007)
Beard (2003)
Behlau (2010)
Blattman (2003)
Boldt (2015)
Boone (1974)
Brauchle (1990)
National Blue Ribbon School in 1998-99
Braun Station (1982)
Burke (2000)
Cable (1958)
Carlos Coon (1978)
Carnahan (2008)
Carson (1998)
Cole (2016)
Ed Cody (1982)
Ellison (2014)
Colonies North (1966)
Driggers (2007)
Elrod (1988)
Esparza (1972)
National Blue Ribbon School in 2000-01
Evers (1992)
Fernandez (1990)
Fields (2016)
Fisher (2006)
Forester (2008)
Franklin (2013)
Galm (1987)
Glass (1956)
Glenn (1962)
Glenoaks (1961)
National Blue Ribbon School in 1998-99
Hatchett (2004)
Helotes (1950)
Henderson (2010)
Hoffmann (2009)
Howsman (1969)
National Blue Ribbon School in 2000-01
Kallison (2017)
Knowlton (1985)
Krueger (2005)
Kuentz (2009)
Langley (2009)
Leon Springs (1991)
Leon Valley (1980)
Lewis (2001)
Lieck (2011)
Linton (1980)
Locke Hill (1975)
National Blue Ribbon School in 1998-99
Los Reyes (2012)
Martin (2010)
Mary Hull (1963)
National Blue Ribbon School in 1996-97
May (1997)
McAndrew (2013)
McDermott (1992)
Mead (2006)
Meadow Village (1968)
Michael (1999)
Mireles (2011)
Mora (2018)
Murnin (2006)
Myers (1997)
Nichols (2002)
Northwest Crossing (1982)
Oak Hills Terrace (1968)
Ott (2004)
Passmore (1970)
Powell (1962)
Raba (2000)
Rhodes (2002)
Scarborough (2008)
Scobee (1987)
Steubing (1997)
Thornton (1989)
Timberwilde (1980)
Tomlinson (2021)
Valley Hi (1963)
Villarreal (1968)
Wanke (2006)
Ward (2003)
Wernli (2020)
Westwood Terrace (1961)

Special schools

Irene L. Chavez Excel Academy
John C. Holmgreen Center
Nellie M. Reddix Center
Northside Alternative High School
Northside Alternative Middle School
Northside Learning Center (Adult Education)
Northside Learning Center (Community Education)

Student locator project
The school district spent over $500,000 on a system whereby students wear an RFID chip and barcode around their necks, allowing the school to track their location during the school day. The students needed the tag "to use the library or cafeteria, vote in school elections, and in some cases for toilet breaks". One student was expelled in 2012 after refusing to either wear the tag or to wear a version of it that included the barcode but not the RFID tag. Her objections were for reasons of religion, privacy, and freedom of expression; the school had also forbidden her from handing out leaflets criticizing the program. She later returned to the school following a federal judge's injunction. The school district's website was brought down in retaliation for the program. An individual claiming responsibility for the website disruption described the school district as "pervs" for their policy of RFID tracking children.

The RFID tracking program was discontinued for the 2013-2014 school year. Even during the controversy, the program was very limited in scope. The schools chosen have the fewest percentage of white students (Jones M.S.: 4% and John Jay H.S.: 13%).

Police department
The Northside Independent School District Police Department is the district's full-service police department. The department has jurisdiction in the district's boundaries, and has primary jurisdiction over all district property regardless of county.

Incidents
On September 11, 2007, NISD police officer Patrick Ritchey reported that he was shot twice through his bulletproof vest with his own pistol after confronting two men after seeing graffiti at Lackland City Elementary School (now Allen Elementary). Following an overnight search by the San Antonio Police Department for the suspects, Ritchey admitted that he shot himself.

On May 16, 2012, NISD police officer Doug Schramm negligently discharged his pistol in his office at Jordan Middle School. Schramm immediately informed the NISD police chief and campus principal, and it was found that the bullet did not leave the office. He was put on administrative leave and later fired on May 29 for unholstering a gun inside the school.

In August 2016, Texas Commission on Law Enforcement investigators recommended criminal charges against NISD police chief Charles Carnes and suspension of his peace officer license for falsely stating that NISD officers do not make routine traffic stops and failing to submit the required racial profiling reports for years.

Shooting of Derek Lopez
On November 12, 2010, Northside ISD police officer Daniel Alvarado shot and killed 14 year old student Derek Lopez. Alvarado witnessed Lopez punch another student at a bus stop and pursued him, then radioed his supervisor who instructed him to stay with the victim. Alvarado returned to his car and ordered the victim into his car and pursued Lopez. Lopez jumped over fences then closed himself in a backyard shed. Alvarado approached the shed with his pistol drawn, and when Lopez opened the door he fired one round. Alvarado claimed he feared for his life and that Lopez was charging for his weapon or had taken a weapon from the shed.

Alvarado had been reprimanded at 12 times and suspended 4 times prior to the incident and on May 29, 2008 the NISD Police Department considered his termination. He resigned in January 2013, and later that year Northside ISD settled the federal lawsuit brought against it by Lopez's mother for $925,000.

History 
The district was formed in 1949 via consolidation of several rural school districts, having a mere 823 students:
Clifton
Culebra
Helotes (including the former Los Reyes district which Helotes absorbed in 1939)
Hoffman
Leon Springs
Leon Valley (including the former Evers district which Leon Valley absorbed in 1924)
Locke Hill
Lockhart
Mackey
San Antonio Heights

See also

List of school districts in Texas
List of people from San Antonio

References

External links

 Northside ISD

School districts in San Antonio
School districts in Bandera County, Texas
School districts in Bexar County, Texas
School districts in Medina County, Texas
School districts in Texas
1949 establishments in Texas
School districts established in 1949